Nussa is an Indonesian animation series produced by The Little Giantz and 4Stripe Productions. The animation has been first airing on YouTube since November 2018, and has been popular since then.

Nussa story lies around the daily lives of Nussa, a boy with his prosthetic leg, and his sister Rarra with their family and friends. Each episode embedded Islamic values, indicating its core as the religious-themed series. Nussa, his cat Anta and Rarra names are intended to reflect the word Nusantara.

Nussa also airs on television starting in 2019, through both Indonesian networks NET during Ramadan and Indosiar in October as well as Malaysia's Astro Ceria in the same year. In Ramadan 2020, the series airing in Indonesia was moved to Trans TV.

Cast 
Muzakki Ramdhan as Nussa
Aysha Razaana Ocean Fajar as Rarra
Jessy Milianty as Umma (Nussa and Rarra's mother)
Malka Hayfa Asyari as Abdul
Mahira Sausan Andi as Syifa
Hamka Siregar as Pak Ucok
Dewi Sandra as Tante Dewi

Awards and nominations

Movie adaptation 
Nussa is planned to be adapted into a theatrical movie, produced both by The Little Giantz and Visinema Pictures. The movie, which bear the same name, was released on October 14, 2021, following several delays due to the coronavirus pandemic.

References

External links 
 
 
 
 

2010s animated television series
2010s Indonesian television series
Indonesian children's animated television series
2010s preschool education television series
2020s preschool education television series
Animated preschool education television series
Animated television series about children
Children's television characters